Aljunied Constituency was a single member constituency in Aljunied, Singapore that was formed in 1959 and continued throughout till 1988 where it was one of the wards that form the Aljunied Group Representation Constituency.

Member of Parliament

Elections

Elections in 1950s

Elections in 1960s

Elections in 1970s

Elections in 1980s

See also 
Aljunied GRC

References

Aljunied
Constituencies established in 1959
Constituencies disestablished in 1988
1959 establishments in Singapore
1988 disestablishments in Singapore
Singaporean electoral divisions